Nicholas James Woods (born 2 January 1986) is an English former first-class cricketer.

The son of Steve Woods, he was born at Bolton in January 1986. He was educated in Bolton at St James CE Secondary School and at Winstanley College in Wigan, before going up to Queen's College, Oxford. While studying at Oxford he played first-class cricket for both Oxford University and Oxford UCCE from 2005–07, making nine appearances. Six of these were for Oxford UCCE, while the remaining three were for Oxford University against Cambridge University in The University Match. He scored 231 runs in his nine first-class matches, at an average of 23.10 and a high score of 27. With his leg break bowling, he took 11 wickets at a bowling average of 65.27 and best figures of 3 for 46. Woods trialled for Lancashire, but was unable to secure a contract.

Notes and references

External links

1986 births
Living people
People from Bolton
People educated at Upholland Grammar School
Alumni of The Queen's College, Oxford
English cricketers
Oxford MCCU cricketers
Oxford University cricketers